Michael Patrick Ryan (14 February 1935 – 20 November 2012) was an Irish soccer coach from Dublin. He was the coach of the 1985 United States women's national soccer team for its first international games in Italy in August 1985. He finished his career by coaching at Nathan Hale High School before retiring in 2012 after having coached for over 60 years.

See also
 List of Golden Scarf recipients

References

Further reading
 Grainey, Timothy (2012), Beyond Bend It Like Beckham: The Global Phenomenon of Women's Soccer, University of Nebraska Press, 
 Lisi, Clemente A. (2010), The U.S. Women's Soccer Team: An American Success Story, Scarecrow Press, 
 Nash, Tim (2016), ''It's Not the Glory: The Remarkable First Thirty Years of US Women's Soccer', Lulu Press,

External links
 Mike Ryan, perhaps the “principal pioneer” of Seattle soccer, died last week at age 77
 10 Questions with Mike Ryan

2012 deaths
American soccer coaches
United States women's national soccer team managers
Irish emigrants to the United States
Sportspeople from Dublin (city)
1935 births
Washington Huskies men's soccer coaches
American women's soccer coaches
High school soccer coaches in the United States